Bratko Kreft (Maribor, 11 February 1905 – 17 July 1996, Ljubljana) was a Slovenian playwright, writer, literary and theater historian and director.

Biography 

He grew up in Prlekija. He studied Slavic Studies in Vienna and Ljubljana. In Ljubljana he also studied comparative literature and literary theory. Among other things, he was the editor and secretary of Kosovel's "Mladina", the artistic director and director of "Delavski oder" in Ljubljana, and the director of the National Theater in Ljubljana. He was a professor of contemporary Russian literature at the Faculty of Arts and a corresponding member of Yugoslav Academy of Sciences and Arts (JAZU). He received the Prešeren Award three times.

Works 

As a playwright, Kreft preferred topics from Slovenian history. Rather than individual fates, he was interested in the relationships between social classes.

Among his major plays are:  
 Celjski grofje
 Kreature
 Velika puntarija 
 Kranjski komedijanti
 Tugomer
 Balada o poročniku in Marjutki
 V ječi življenja.

1905 births
1996 deaths
Slovenian Jews
Slovenian editors
Slovenian dramatists and playwrights
Slovenian theatre directors
20th-century Slovenian historians
Jewish dramatists and playwrights
University of Vienna alumni
University of Ljubljana alumni
Academic staff of the University of Ljubljana
20th-century dramatists and playwrights
Writers from Maribor